The South African Railways Class 8C 4-8-0 of 1903 was a steam locomotive from the pre-Union era in Transvaal Colony.

In 1903, soon after the establishment of the Central South African Railways, a second batch of thirty Cape 8th Class  Mastodon steam locomotives were ordered and placed in service as the Class 8-L3, immediately following upon a previous order in that same year for a variation on the same locomotive type. In 1912, when they were assimilated into the South African Railways, they were renumbered and designated Class 8C.

Manufacturer
Upon the establishment of the Central South African Railways (CSAR) in July 1902, soon after the end of the Second Boer War, Chief Locomotive Superintendent P.A. Hyde became the custodian of a mixed bag of locomotives inherited from the Imperial Military Railways (IMR). Apart from those engines which had been acquired new by the IMR during the war, these included locomotives which originated with the Selati Railway, the Nederlandsche Zuid-Afrikaansche Spoorweg-Maatschappij (NZASM), the Pretoria-Pietersburg Railway (PPR) and the Oranje-Vrijstaat Gouwerment Spoorwegen (OVGS).

The comparatively small number of serviceable locomotives which were immediately available for service, compounded by the poor condition of many of the original NZASM, PPR, Selati and OVGS locomotives and an expected post-war increase in traffic, led to an order for altogether sixty new steam locomotives. They were built in two versions to the specifications of the 8th Class  Mastodon type which had been designed by H.M. Beatty, the Chief Locomotive Superintendent of the Cape Government Railways (CGR) from 1896 to 1910.

Orders were placed with Neilson, Reid and Company in 1903, but while the locomotives were being built, Neilson, Reid amalgamated with Dübs and Company and Sharp, Stewart and Company to form the North British Locomotive Company (NBL). As a result, the thirty locomotives of the second batch, numbered in the range from 471 to 500, were all delivered as built by NBL at the Hyde Park shops of the former Neilson, Reid.

They differed from the first batch of the same order by not being equipped with Drummond water tubes in the fireboxes. To differentiate them from the Class 8-L1 and the Drummond tube-equipped Class 8-L2, these locomotives were designated the CSAR Class 8-L3. These were the last locomotives to be ordered by the CSAR which were built to the design of another railway.

Class 8 sub-classes
When the Union of South Africa was established on 31 May 1910, the three Colonial government railways (CGR, Natal Government Railways and CSAR) were united under a single administration to control and administer the railways, ports and harbours of the Union. Although the South African Railways and Harbours came into existence in 1910, the actual classification and renumbering of all the rolling stock of the three constituent railways were only implemented with effect from 1 January 1912.

In 1912, these thirty locomotives were renumbered in the range from 1162 to 1191 and designated Class 8C on the South African Railways (SAR).

These locomotives, together with the CSAR’s Class 8-L1 and 8-L2  Mastodon locomotives and all the CGR’s 8th Class  Consolidations and  Mastodons, were grouped into ten different sub-classes by the SAR. The  locomotives became SAR Classes 8 and 8A to 8F and the  locomotives became Classes 8X to 8Z.

Modification
During A.G. Watson’s term as the Chief Mechanical Engineer of the SAR from 1929 to 1936, many of the Class 8 to Class 8F locomotives were equipped with superheated boilers, larger bore cylinders and either inside or outside admission piston valves.

Of the Class 8C locomotives, seven were equipped with superheating,  bore cylinders and outside admission piston valves while retaining their Class 8C classification.

Five locomotives were equipped with superheating,  bore cylinders and inside admission piston valves, and were reclassified to Class 8CW.

Service
In SAR service, the  Class 8 family of locomotives worked on every system in the country and, in the 1920s, became the mainstay of motive power on many branch lines. Their final days were spent in shunting service. They were all withdrawn from service by 1972.

Works numbers
The Class 8C and 8CW works numbers, renumbering and superheating modifications are listed in the table.

Illustration

References

1550
1550
4-8-0 locomotives
2D locomotives
NBL locomotives
Cape gauge railway locomotives
Railway locomotives introduced in 1903
1903 in South Africa
Scrapped locomotives